Mabuiag Island Airport  is an airport on Mabuiag Island, Queensland, Australia. The airport received $52,422 in funds for security updates in 2006. It has Australia's shortest runway in commercial service.

Airlines and destinations

See also
 List of airports in Queensland

References

Airports in Queensland